Galium sparsiflorum is a species of flowering plant in the coffee family known by the common name Sequoia bedstraw. It is endemic to California, where it grows in shaded habitat in certain mountain ranges, including the Sierra Nevada.

Galium sparsiflorum is a perennial herb forming tufts of erect stems 30 to 50 centimeters tall with woody bases. The stems are ringed with whorls of four rounded to oval leaves each up to 2.5 centimeters long. The plant is dioecious, with male plants bearing clusters of flowers and female plants with usually solitary flowers in leaf axils.

Subspecies
Two subspecies are recognized (May 2014):

Galium sparsiflorum subsp. glabrius Dempster & Stebbins - northwestern California
Galium sparsiflorum subsp. sparsiflorum - central California

References

External links
Jepson Manual Treatment
USDA Plants Profile
Photo gallery
Photo of herbarium specimen at New York Botanical Garden, type of Galium sparsiflorum 
Gardening Europe

sparsiflorum
Flora of North America
Plants described in 1900
Endemic flora of California
Dioecious plants
Flora without expected TNC conservation status